Chen Kun (born 5 March 1980 in Panzhihua, Sichuan, China) is a Chinese baseball player who was a member of Team China at the 2008 Summer Olympics. He also played for China at the 1999 Asian Baseball Championship, 2005 Konami Cup Asia Series, 2005 Baseball World Cup, 2006 Asian Games, 2006 World Baseball Classic, 2009 World Baseball Classic, 2013 World Baseball Classic and 2017 World Baseball Classic.

References
Profile 2008 Olympics Team China

1980 births
Living people
2006 World Baseball Classic players
2009 World Baseball Classic players
2013 World Baseball Classic players
2017 World Baseball Classic players
Asian Games competitors for China
Baseball players at the 2006 Asian Games
Baseball players at the 2008 Summer Olympics
Baseball players at the 2010 Asian Games
Baseball players from Sichuan
Olympic baseball players of China
Chinese baseball players
People from Panzhihua
Sichuan Dragons players